Alberta has provincial legislation allowing its municipalities to conduct municipal censuses between April 1 and June 30 inclusive. Due to the concurrency of Statistics Canada conducting the Canada 2016 Census in May 2016, the Government of Alberta offered municipalities the option to alter their 2016 municipal census timeframes to either March 1 through May 31 or May 1 through July 31. Municipalities choose to conduct their own censuses for multiple reasons such as to better inform municipal service planning and provision, to capitalize on per capita based grant funding from higher levels of government, or to simply update their populations since the last federal census.

With the dissolution of the villages of Galahad and Strome on January 1, 2016, Alberta had 354 municipalities in 2016. Alberta Municipal Affairs recognized those conducted by 21 of these municipalities. By municipal status, it recognized those conducted by 11 of Alberta's 18 cities, 5 of 108 towns, 2 of 90 villages, and 3 of 64 municipal districts. In addition to those recognized by Municipal Affairs, a census was planned by the Village of Forestburg for 2016 but was subsequently deferred to 2017.

Some municipalities achieved population milestones as a result of their 2016 censuses. Airdrie became the eighth city in Alberta to exceed 60,000 residents, while Leduc surpassed 30,000 people and Cochrane grew beyond the 25,000 mark. Edmonton fell short of the 900,000-mark by 553 people, while Red Deer dipped back below 100,000 residents after surpassing that milestone in 2015.

Municipal census results 
The following summarizes the results of the numerous municipal censuses conducted in 2016.

Breakdowns

Hamlets 
The following is a list of hamlet populations determined by 2016 municipal censuses conducted by Lac La Biche County and the Municipal District of Taber.

Shadow population counts 
Alberta Municipal Affairs defines shadow population as "temporary residents of a municipality who are employed by an industrial or commercial establishment in the municipality for a minimum of 30 days within a municipal census year." Lac La Biche County conducted a shadow population count in 2016. The following presents the results of this count for comparison with its concurrent municipal census results.

Notes

See also 
2013 Alberta municipal elections
List of communities in Alberta

References

External links 
Alberta Municipal Affairs: Municipal Census & Population Lists
Statistics Canada: Census Profile (2011 Census)
2016 municipal census links by municipality:
Airdrie: 2016 Census Fact Sheets
Beaumont: 2016 Beaumont Census Report
Blackfalds: Census Report 2016
Calgary: 2016 Civic Census Results
Camrose: Census 2016 Information & Results
Chestermere: 2016 Municipal Census Staff Report
Cochrane: 2016 Municipal Census Summary Report
Edmonton 2016 Municipal Census Results
Fort Saskatchewan 2016 Municipal Census Results
Leduc: Census Information, Leduc Census 2016
Lethbridge: 2016 Census Results
Morinville: 2016 Municipal Census 
Raymond: Town of Raymond Census Results – 2016
Red Deer: 2016 Municipal Census Report 
Spruce Grove: Demographic Report 2016
St. Albert: 2016 St. Albert Census, Municipal Census Report 

Local government in Alberta
Municipal censuses in Alberta
2016 censuses
2016 in Alberta